Qaleh Tork-e Olya (also Romanized as Qal‘eh Tork-e ‘Olyā; also known as Qal‘a Turk, Qal‘eh Turk, and Qal‘eh-ye Tork) is a village in Harasam Rural District, Homeyl District, Eslamabad-e Gharb County, Kermanshah Province, Iran. At the 2006 census, its population was 181, in 40 families.

References 

Populated places in Eslamabad-e Gharb County